Mohamed Abdel Kader Salem (Arabic: محمد عبد القادر سالم; born 23 August 1948) is an Egyptian academic and politician, He is the Former Cabinet Minister of Communications and Information Technology, Egypt.

Early life and education 
Mohamed Salem holds Ph.D. and M.Sc. in electrical engineering-computers and systems engineering, from Faculty of Engineering Ain Shams University, and B.Sc. in electrical engineering from the Military Technical College.

Professional career 
Salem retired from Armed Forces in June 1993 as brigadier general. He joined ITI (Information Technology Institute) in July the same year as the manager of fresh graduate department. Soon after he was promoted to be the Vice Chairman of ITI, and the chairman in July 2002.

On July 21, 2011, He sworn the oath as the 4th Minister of Communications and Information Technology in Egypt, Dr Essam Sharaf Cabinet. On December 7 the same year, He sworn his second oath as the Minister of Communications and Information Technology in Egypt, Dr Kamal Al Ganzory Cabinet.

Salem led the efforts to elect Egypt to chair the executive office of Arab ministers of communications and information technology, He chaired the office in June 2012.

As minister of communications and information technology Salem chaired the boards of the National Telecommunications Regulatory Authority (NTRA), the Information Technology Industry Development Agency (ITIDA), National Telecommunication Institute (NTI), the Information Technology Institute (ITI), the Technology Innovation and Entrepreneurship Center (TIEC), and oversaw Telecom Egypt (TE) and Egypt Post.

In May 2015, Salem was appointed by the prime minister (Ibrahim Mahlab) as member of the board of Telecom Egypt. He was elected to be the chairman of the board of the Company. He also held the position as the Chairman of the Board of TeData Company.

Salem served on the board of advisory, trustees, and directors in various universities, institutes, centers. He chaired a number of international conferences in the fields of ICT, GIS, and MM.

Professional achievements 
Leading and managing the communications and information technology sector in Egypt in one of the most difficult periods in Egyptian history, and with all the difficulties and problems, the sector succeeded in issuing the National Strategy for Communications and Information Technology 2012-2017, launching the "Arab Digital Content" initiative - the "Connect Arab Summit 2012", Doha, March 2012, empowering the project (eMisr) Egypt broadband internet strategy, launching the initiative “Back to Africa”, establishing a specialized department for people with special needs, and holding the first specialized conference for this purpose (Empowerment Conference for People with Disabilities, March 2012), and launching the Electronic signature initiative.

For twenty years working as Vice Chairman and Chairman of ITI-MCIT He led The Institute to become the largest institute of its kind in the Middle East and Africa and one of the best specialized training centers in information technology at the global level, spreading the culture of information and communication technology in all parts of Egypt, designing and implementing the (EduEgypt) program in Egyptian universities, graduating more than ten thousand IT professionals at the global level.

Academic career 
For more than 30 years, Salem was a lecturer of computer engineering, information systems and computer science in the areas of artificial intelligence and expert systems, software engineering, management information systems, software project management, decision support systems and electronic commerce, at Cairo University, the Arab Academy for Sciences and Technology, and many others. As a consultant He has worked in the fields of computers and information systems, information technology and artificial intelligence applications.

Consultancy 
Salem currently works as senior consultant of communications and information technology for regional and international organizations.

Salem still performing key note speeches in international conferences and webinars. He also still lecturing in workshops, universities, international organizations in the field of communications and information technology.

Personal life 
Salem is married, has two children, and three granddaughters.

Publications
GIS Professional Training, Egypt's Experience, Kuwait 1st International GIS Conference, Kuwait 5-7 Feb., 2005.
ITI Experience Towards E-Learning, 3rd Conference on E-Learning Applications, AUC, Cairo, 15-16 Jan., 2005.
Distant Learning, ITI Experience, Using the IT & Telecommunication in E-Education (with focus on the Arabic content on the Internet), Regional Seminar, Damascus, Syria, and 15-17 Jul., 2003.
Distant Learning, Will it Become the First Discipline? OICC 7th Seminar on GIS applications in Planning and Sustainable Development, Cairo Egypt, 13-15 Feb., 2001. 
Adaptive Intelligent Agent, a Design Approach for a Decision Support System, Scientific Bulletin, Faculty of Engineering, Ain Shams University, No. 01/31, 31/3/1996. 
Computer Network Security, Technology and Armament Magazine, Vol. 5, No. 3, July 1990.
Computer Virus, Assigned Research by His Excellency the Egyptian Chief of Staff of the Armed Forces, January 1990

References

Communications Ministers of Egypt
Living people
Ain Shams University alumni
Academic staff of Cairo University
Academic staff of October 6 University
Academic staff of Misr International University
1948 births